Simone Jardim (pronounced Si-MO-nee zhar-ZHING; born November 7, 1979) is a Brazilian-American professional pickleball player. Jardim was ranked the number one woman player in the world from 2016 to 2020. She won the US Open women's singles four consecutive times (2016, 2017, 2018, 2019) and is a two-time triple crown winner of the US Open Pickleball championships, winning in singles, women's doubles and mixed doubles in 2017 and 2018.  As of 2021, Jardim holds the record for most women's Pro Pickleball Association titles with 32. Jardim is a former All-American collegiate tennis player and was the head tennis coach at Michigan State University from 2009 to 2016.

Early life
Jardim was born and raised in Santa Maria, Brazil. She moved to the United States at 18 years of age to play tennis for Auburn University. After two years, she transferred to Fresno State University where she was a two-time All-American in women's doubles tennis. In 2003, she graduated from Fresno State with a BA degree in Mass Communication and Journalism.

Tennis career
After college, Jardim worked for three years as an assistant tennis coach at Fresno State University during which time the team had a 58-20 record, won three WAC conference championships and finished her third year ranked at number 20 in the nation. In 2008, Jardim became the assistant coach for the College of William & Mary tennis team and was named interim head coach at the end of the season. In 2009, she became the head tennis coach at Michigan State University and coached for 8 seasons. During her tenure, the MSU team achieved two of its three most successful seasons: with records of 17-9 in 2014 and 16-9 in 2015. In 2016, Jardim resigned as head coach in order to relocate with her family to Florida.

Pickleball career
Jardim became a professional pickleball player in 2015 and took up the profession full-time in 2016 after moving to Florida. In 2016, Jardim won her first US Open pickleball championship in women's singles. The following year she earned the US Open triple crown with titles in singles, doubles (with Corrine Carr) and mixed doubles (with Oliver Strecker). She repeated the US Open triple crown in 2018, winning the singles title against her former student Lucy Kovalova and earning victories in doubles with Corrine Carr and mixed doubles with Kyle Yates. At the 2019 US Open championships, Jardim again won the singles title (against Irene Tereschenko) and mixed doubles with Kyle Yates, but lost the women's doubles title (with Corrine Carr) in the finals against Lucy Kovalova and Irene Tereschenko.

In 2021, Jardim reduced her playing time by stepping away from women's singles. In the 2021 US Open, she and playing partner, Lucy Kovalova, were runner-up in women's doubles to the team of Catherine Parenteau and Callie Smith; she and playing partner, Ben Johns, won the mixed doubles title. As of 2021, she has the most career PPA titles among women players with 32 and was ranked No. 1 in the world in women's doubles (with playing partner Lucy Kovalova) and mixed doubles (with Ben Johns) by the Pro Pickleball Association (PPA).

Jardim is co-founder and co-director of Peak Performance Pickleball Academy in Bonita Springs, Florida. She has sponsor endorsements with JOOLA, Jigsaw Health and Nike.

Personal life
Jardim lives in Naples, Florida. She is married to Chad Edwards with whom she has two children.

References

1979 births
American sportswomen
Brazilian sportswomen
Living people
Pickleball players
Sportspeople from Florida
21st-century American women